Animesh is an Indic given name. The following notable people have the given name: 
 Animesh Nandy Bangladeshi singer and Electrical and Electronics Engineer.
 Animesh Aich  Bangladeshi film maker, actor, director and writer. 
 Animesh Ray professor of computational and molecular biology 
 Animesh Debbarma the leader of the National Conference of Tripura party 
 Animesh Chakravorty Bengali Indian academic and a professor of chemistry. 
 Animesh Roy Cybersecurity consultant, CEO of Arishti Consolidated Private limited.
 Animesh Sharma Digital strategist and consultant, Digitalwala

Animesh may also refer to: 
 Animesh quartet  series novels by Samaresh Majumdar whose principal character is Animesh Mitra